Ryoko Eda (née Kitajima; born 12 June 1976) is a Japanese marathon runner. Her personal best time is 2:24:54 hours, achieved at the 2005 Nagoya Marathon.

Achievements
All results regarding marathon, unless stated otherwise

References

External links 

marathoninfo

1976 births
Living people
Japanese female long-distance runners
Japanese female marathon runners
20th-century Japanese women
21st-century Japanese women